Argentine State Railway (in Spanish: Ferrocarriles del Estado) was a State-owned railway company of Argentina, established by Law N° 6.757 in October 1909, when José Figueroa Alcorta was the President of Argentina. The company built and operated railway lines in Argentina.

History 
By 1905 the State-owned railway network was 3,490 km length, with the Ferrocarril Central Norte (FCN) being the longest with 1,385 km and the Ferrocarril Argentino del Norte (FAN) with 563 km. Five years later, FCN was 2,135 km long and FAN 1,355 km.

In 1925, the Argentine State Railway ranked 2nd among the most important companies in the country, operating a railway network of 6,617 km. By 1936 the railway network had been extended to 9,690 km.

Most of the railway lines built by the Argentine state were metre gauge because of financial reasons. In 1937 the State company began to acquire some existing companies with the purpose of competing against British railway companies. In 1948 Argentine State Company (along with British and French companies) became part of Ferrocarriles Argentinos after nationalisation of the railway network, headed by then-President Juan Domingo Perón. Therefore, the Central Northern rail lines were added to General Belgrano Railway network while the Patagonian railways became part of General Roca Railway.

Railway network 
Argentine State Railway network as of 1936:

Note:
 (1) The Central Northern had previously taken over North Argentine Railway in 1909.

Gallery

See also 
 Rail transport in Argentina
 General Belgrano Railway
 General Roca Railway
 State-owned Argentine Railway Companies

Bibliography 
 Ferrocarriles del Estado on CEPAL Library
 Historia de la Ingeniería Argentina, Centro Argentino de Ingenieros (1981)

Railway companies established in 1909
Railway companies disestablished in 1948